Joppa, Scotland may refer to:

 Joppa, Edinburgh
 Joppa, Ayrshire